Rúben António Almeida Guerreiro (born 6 July 1994) is a Portuguese professional road racing cyclist, who currently rides for UCI WorldTeam .

In August 2016,  announced that they had signed Guerreiro through to 2018. He joined  for the 2019 season, on a one-year contract. In August 2019, he was named in the startlist for the 2019 Vuelta a España.

In October 2020, he was named in the startlist for the 2020 Giro d'Italia. He won the ninth stage and finished the race as the leader of the mountains classification, becoming the first Portuguese rider to win a Grand Tour classification.

Major results

2012
 1st  Road race, National Junior Road Championships
2014
 1st  Overall Volta a Portugal do Futuro
1st  Young rider classification
1st Stage 3
2015
 1st  Overall GP Liberty Seguros
1st  Young rider classification
1st Stage 2
 National Under-23 Road Championships
2nd Road race
3rd Time trial
 10th Overall Tour de Beauce
2016
 1st  Road race, National Under-23 Road Championships
 1st Gran Premio Palio del Recioto
 3rd Liège–Bastogne–Liège Espoirs
2017
 1st  Road race, National Road Championships
 6th Bretagne Classic
 9th Overall Tour of Belgium
2018
 4th Overall Herald Sun Tour
 5th Bretagne Classic
 5th Primus Classic
 6th Overall Tour of Turkey
 9th Overall Tour Down Under
 10th Overall Tour des Fjords
2019
 8th Overall Tour Down Under
2020
 Giro d'Italia
1st  Mountains classification
1st Stage 9
2021
 8th Overall Tour of the Alps
 10th Coppa Sabatini
2022
 1st Mont Ventoux Dénivelé Challenge
 3rd Overall Deutschland Tour
 6th Overall Vuelta a Burgos
1st  Points classification
 7th La Flèche Wallonne
 9th Overall Critérium du Dauphiné
2023
 1st  Overall Saudi Tour
1st Stage 4
 3rd Overall O Gran Camiño

Grand Tour general classification results timeline

References

External links

 

1994 births
Living people
Portuguese male cyclists
People from Montijo, Portugal
Portuguese Giro d'Italia stage winners
Sportspeople from Setúbal District
21st-century Portuguese people